Ülle Toming (born on 16 February 1955 in Tallinn) is an Estonian dancer, actress, singer and dance pedagogue.

In 1973 she graduated from Tallinn Choreographic School. In 1983 she graduated from Tallinn Pedagogical Institute with a degree in cultural education and in 1999 received her master's in cultural history in 1999. Toming has worked as a lecturer at Tallinn University since 1983, and was a dance teacher at the Tallinn Ballet School from 1989 until 1999.

1973–1992 she worked at bar-varieties Tallinn and Viru Folk-show. She has also played in several films. Toming was married to actor Jüri Krjukov from 1990 until his death in 1997.

Filmography

 1976 	Aeg elada, aeg armastada 
 1989 	Perekonnapildid
 1998 	Georgica 
 2008  Detsembrikuumus
 2017 	Mehetapja/Süütu/Vari

References

Living people
1955 births
Estonian female dancers
Estonian stage actresses
Estonian film actresses
20th-century Estonian actresses
21st-century Estonian actresses
Tallinn University alumni
Academic staff of Tallinn University
Actresses from Tallinn
People from Tallinn